Desire for Freedom was singer/songwriter Jim Diamond's second studio album.
Released in 1986 it featured a wide range of styles such as heartfelt ballads and
stirring rockers. Singles that came from this album were "Hi Ho Silver", "Young Love (Carry Me Away)", "Desire" and "So Strong". It is currently out of print, though most tracks appear on The Best of Jim Diamond.

Track listing
All tracks composed by Jim Diamond and Paul "Wix" Wickens; except where indicated
"Desire"
"So Strong"
"Young Love (Carry Me Away)"
"My Weakness Is You"
"I Can't Stop"
"Maybe One Day"
"Hi Ho Silver" (Jim Diamond, Chris Parren)
"Judy's Not That Tough" (Jim Diamond, Alan Gorrie)
"You'll Go Crazy"

Personnel
Jim Diamond - vocals
Phil Palmer, Robbie McIntosh - guitar
Graham Lyle - acoustic guitar on "My Weakness Is You"
John McKenzie - bass
Paul "Wix" Wickens - keyboards
Tony Beard - drums 
Tony Hicks - drums on "Hi Ho Silver"
Gary Barnacle - tenor saxophone on "Maybe One Day"
Dick Morrissey - tenor saxophone on "So Strong" and "Young Love (Carry Me Away)"
Pandit Dinesh - percussion
Gavyn Wright - violin on "I Can't Stop"
Mark Felton - harmonica on "Hi Ho Silver"
Pete Thoms - trombone
Luke Tanny - trumpet
Chris Thompson, Katie Kissoon, Lance Ellington - backing vocals 
Sammy Brown, Vicki Brown - backing vocals on "Maybe One Day"

Jim Diamond (singer) albums
1986 albums
A&M Records albums